Diederik van Domburg (15 October 1685, Utrecht – 7 June 1736, Colombo) was the 23rd Governor of Zeylan during the Dutch period in Ceylon. He was appointed on 27 January 1734 and was Governor until 7 June 1736. He was succeeded by acting Governor Jan Maccare.

References

1685 births
1736 deaths
18th-century Dutch people
Dutch expatriates in Sri Lanka
Governors of Dutch Ceylon
People from Utrecht (city)